Piptatherum is a genus of plants in the grass family known as ricegrass.

They are widely distributed across much of Eurasia, North Africa, and North America. These are clumping perennial grasses with long, tapering leaf blades.

 Species

 formerly included
see Achnatherum Arundinella Eriochloa Nassella Oryzopsis Piptatheropsis Piptochaetium Stipa

References

Poaceae genera
Grasses of Africa
Grasses of Asia
Grasses of Europe
Grasses of North America
Taxa named by Palisot de Beauvois
Pooideae